Swarthmore may refer to:
Swarthmore Lecture, an annual lecture given during the Britain Yearly Meeting
Swarthmore, Pennsylvania, a borough in Pennsylvania
Swarthmore College, a liberal arts college in Pennsylvania 
List of Swarthmore College people, individuals associated with the above college
Swarthmore station, a railroad station in Swarthmore, Pennsylvania
Swarthmore High School, a secondary school (now closed) in Swarthmore, Pennsylvania

See also
Swarthmoor Hall, historic Quaker site in Cumbria, England
Swarthmoor, a village from which the above gets its name